Rework can refer to:

Technology
 Rework (electronics), the process of removing a component from a printed circuit board and then re-soldering it on
 Rework, the step in the software inspection process during software development when discovered defects are corrected
 Rework, a step in the Fagan inspection process during software development

Science
 Reworked fossil, a fossil that lies in another stratum than the one into which it was originally deposited

Culture
 REWORK (book), a 2010 book by 37signals
 ReWorked, a 2006 remix album by RuPaul
 Body Rework, a remix album by EBM band Nitzer Ebb